Hapoel Lod is a basketball team representing Lod, Israel. The team competes in Liga Artzit.

References

Basketball teams in Israel